Lisle Carleton Carter Jr. (November 18, 1925 – September 10, 2009) was an American administrator who worked for civic organizations, educational institutions, and the federal government. He was also the first modern President of the University of the District of Columbia (UDC) following the merger of three DC universities.

Early life and education
Carter was born in New York City and spent most of his childhood in Barbados. His father, Lisle Carter Sr., was a prominent Harlem dentist, and his mother, Eunice Carter, was the first black woman district attorney in the state of New York. Carter graduated from high school at age 15, and from there spent two years at Cazenovia College. He later graduated from Dartmouth College in New Hampshire in 1945, then served in the Army for two years before receiving a law degree from St. John's University School of Law in New York in 1950.

Legal, government and academic career
Carter was Executive Director of the Washington Urban League in the mid-1950s, and later worked for the National Urban League in New York.  He entered government as a Deputy Assistant Secretary at the U.S. Department of Health, Education and Welfare under the Kennedy Administration.  He later became an Assistant Director of the Office of Economic Opportunity, and then became Assistant Secretary of HEW under the Johnson Administration, becoming one of the highest-ranking African Americans in that department before leaving in 1968.

He later became a Vice President at Cornell University, and spent three years as Chancellor of the Atlanta University Center, a consortium of historically black colleges in downtown Atlanta, before becoming President of UDC in 1977.

After leaving UDC, Carter returned to practice law in Washington. He retired in the early 1990s as general counsel of the United Way.

Carter was a past board chairman of the Children's Defense Fund, a nonprofit child advocacy organization, and served on the board of the Kettering Foundation, a science, education and international and urban affairs research foundation. He was a trustee for Georgetown University, Dartmouth College, the Pension Rights Center and the Aspen Institute.

Personal
Carter's first wife, Emily Elizabeth Ellis, died in 1989. In 1991, he married art historian and author Jane Livingston. Carter had five children with his first wife, one of whom is author and Yale Law professor Stephen L. Carter.

References

Selected publications

External links

Portrait of Lisle C. Carter Jr., Getty Images.

1925 births
2009 deaths
Dartmouth College alumni
St. John's University School of Law alumni
Presidents of the University of the District of Columbia
Kennedy administration personnel
Lawyers from New York City
People from Harlem
20th-century American lawyers
African-American lawyers
Lawyers from Washington, D.C.
Cornell University faculty